The Dismissal of the Greek Envoys (also translated as The Dismissal of the Grecian Envoys, The Discharge of the Greek Envoys or just The Envoys) is a tragedy written by Polish Renaissance poet Jan Kochanowski in c. 1565-66 and first published and preformed in 1578. It recounts an incident leading up to the Trojan War, inspired by the writings of Homer. It is widely recognized as one of Kochanowski's finest works, and the most significant early plays written in Polish.

History 
However, Nobel laureate Czesław Miłosz implied it was commissioned by Jan Zamoyski for his wedding, an event that took part in the late 1570s. In either case, the play was not published or prefermed until it debuted at said wedding of Jan Zamoyski and Krystyna Radziwiłł at Ujazdów Castle in Warsaw on 12 January 1578, in front of the royal court and king Stephen Báthory. Many of the actors in the premiere were royal courtiers and the play was directed by physician Wojciech Oczko.

it was translated into English as The Dismissal of the Grecian Envoys by George Rapall Noyes and Ruth Earl Merrill in 1918, and under the same title by Charles S. Kraszewski in 1994; as The Dismissal of the Greek Envoys by Barry Keane in 1999; and most recently, as The Envoys by Bill Johnston in 2007.

Plot summary 
The plot of the play focuses on the arrival of the titular Greek envoys at Troy, in order to prevent the outbreak of hostilities - an event mentioned in Homer's Illyad. The envoys ask for the return of kindapped Helen. Some statesman from Troy, let by Antenor, support such an action, but in the end they are overruled by more vocal faction led by Helen's abductor Paris.

Analysis 
This was a blank-verse tragedy of elevent and thirteen syllables. In its structure it is a typical Renaissance work, inspired by Horace and subsequent French and Italian developments (works of Scaliger). It is divided into five acts, from the exposition to the announcement of the tragedy to the tragedy itself. Events that happen outside of the stage are summarized in dialogues, including a vision of Cassandra. It was the first tragedy written in Polish.

Miłosz wrote that the drama is "neither a tragedy of passions nor a tragedy of a revelead fate... the fatal outcome is due not to an inexorable fatality but merely to stupidy and demagoguery." The tragedy depicted is that of characters who understand what is at stake but who cannot stop the whells of events put in motion, ushering the impending doom (the Trojan War). As such, Miłosz writes, the play has no heroes outside the state of Troy.

The works main theme are the responsibilities of statesmanship, critique of weak rulers and failings of power, where the voice of "wise and reasonable" is drawned by that of passionate but selfish and poorly educated youth.  commented on its universal values such as "the truth about the superiority of the common good and dependence of the country and of its future on its citizens’ stance". The tragedy also connected to the 16th century reality of Polish-Lithuanian Commonwealth, with the deliberations of Greek statesmen resembling that of Polish Sejm, and the weakness and impotence of King Priam was a commentary on the Commonwealth's constitutional monarchy.

Reception 
The play is one of Kochanowski's more important and better known works; already described as well studied by scholars in the mid-1960s. Miłosz called it "the finest specimen of Polish humanist drama". Kotarski in turn wrote that the work "was Poland’s first really poetic and deeply reflective drama, the first and for a hundred years the only one". Despite its significance, it failed to inspire much imitators in Poland, at least  not until centuries later (works of Stanisław Wyspiański).

See also 

 Theatre of Poland

References

Works by Jan Kochanowski
Polish plays
Tragedies (dramas)
1578 works
Trojan War literature
Polish-language plays
Renaissance plays
Plays based on the Iliad